Elizabeth Clinton may refer to:
 Elizabeth Blount, married name Elizabeth Clinton, mistress of Henry VIII, first wife of Edward Clinton, 1st Earl of Lincoln
Elizabeth FitzGerald, Countess of Lincoln (1527–1589), aka The Fair Geraldine, Irish noblewoman; 3rd wife of Edward Clinton, 1st Earl of Lincoln
Elizabeth Clinton, Countess of Lincoln (c. 1570–1638), formerly Elizabeth Knyvet, wife of Thomas Clinton, 3rd Earl of Lincoln